Luke Mwananshiku (1938 – March 2, 2003) was a Zambian banker, businessman, politician and diplomat. He was a government minister under Zambia's first president, Kenneth Kaunda, serving as the Governor of the Bank of Zambia from 1976 to 1981, and as Minister of Foreign Affairs from 1986 to 1990. Mwananshiku was also Minister of Finance from 1982 to 1987. He served as a director of the Zambia Consolidated Copper Mines and of the International Monetary Fund. He died at the Trust Hospital in Lusaka of heart failure in 2003.

References

1938 births
2003 deaths
Governors of Bank of Zambia
Foreign Ministers of Zambia
Finance Ministers of Zambia
United National Independence Party politicians
Members of the National Assembly of Zambia
Zambian economists